Nicholas Tate is a historian.

Nicholas Tate may also refer to:

Nicholas Tate III, fictional character in Area 7
Nick Tate, Australian actor

See also